The 2013–14 Druga HNL (also known as 2. HNL) was the 23rd season of Croatia's second level football competition since its establishment in 1992.

NK Zagreb were league champions and earned a place in Croatia's first division, Prva HNL.

Format
The league was contested by 12 teams (four less than in the previous season). Only two teams from Treća HNL were granted license for competing in the Druga HNL, HNK Segesta and HNK Val. Segesta won the qualification playoffs by 3-2 on aggregate and earned a place in Druga HNL.

Zagreb, Cibalia and Inter Zaprešić were relegated from 2012–13 Prva HNL.

Changes from last season
The following clubs have been promoted or relegated at the end of the 2012–13 season:

From 2. HNL
Promoted to 1. HNL
 Hrvatski Dragovoljac

Relegated to 3. HNL
 Šibenik (4th place)
 Mosor (12th place)
 Junak Sinj (13th place)
 Imotski (14th place)
 Primorac 1929 (15th place)
 HAŠK (16th place)

Relegated to County league (fifth tier)
 Vinogradar (5th place)

To 2. HNL
Relegated from 1. HNL
 Zagreb (12th place)
 Cibalia (11th place)
 Inter Zaprešić (10th place)

Promoted from 3. HNL
 Segesta (3. HNL Center and promotion qualification winners)

Clubs

League table

Results

Matches 1–22

Matches 23–33

Top goalscorers
The top scorers in the 2013–14 Druga HNL season were:

See also
2013–14 Prva HNL
2013–14 Croatian Cup

References

External links
Official website  

First Football League (Croatia) seasons
2
Cro